KNCY (1600 kHz) is an AM radio station broadcasting a classic country format. Licensed to Nebraska City, Nebraska, United States, the station serves the Omaha area. The station is currently owned by Flood Broadcasting, Inc. and features programming from ABC Radio .

On October 9, 2017, KNCY changed their format from news to classic country, branded as "Otoe County Country".

Previous logo

References

External links

NCY (AM)
Classic country radio stations in the United States